The Lotru Bridge is a bridge over the Olt River between the cities of Piatra Olt and Drăgăşani.

The bridge is 200 m in length with 4 spans of 50 m, each being constructed as a steel truss bridge.

See also
List of bridges in Romania

External links
 Description

Bridges in Romania
Bridges completed in 1899
Road-rail bridges
Railway bridges in Romania
Truss bridges
Steel bridges
1899 establishments in Romania
19th-century architecture in Romania